Google Programmable Search Engine (formerly known as Google Custom Search and Google Co-op) is a platform provided by Google that allows web developers to feature specialized information in web searches, refine and categorize queries and create customized search engines, based on Google Search. The service allows users to narrow the 11.5 billion indexed webpages down to a topical group of pages relevant to the creator's needs. Google launched the service on October 23, 2006.

Services
The Google Custom Search platform consists of three services:

Custom Search Engine

Released on October 23, 2006, Google Programmable Search allows anyone to create their own search engine by themselves. Search engines can be created to search for information on particular topics chosen by the creator. Google Programmable Search Engine allows creators to select what websites will be used to search for information which helps to eliminate any unwanted websites or information. Creators can also attach their custom search engine to any blog or webpage. Google AdSense results can also be triggered from certain search queries, which would generate revenue for the site owner.

Subscribed Links
Provided as part of the original service, subscribed links were discontinued on 15 September 2011.

Subscribed Links were web results that users could manually subscribe to. Anyone was allowed to make a new Subscribed Link, and did not necessarily need knowledge on how to create a feed, as a basic link could be created. Subscriptions were then available in a special directory.

Topics
Topics are specific areas of search, which can be developed by people with knowledge of a certain subject. These topics are then displayed at the top of relevant Google web searches, so the user can refine the searches to what they want. Currently, there is a limited number of topics that Google is wanting to develop, namely Health, Destination Guides, Autos, Computer games, Photography and Home Theater.

See also
 Yahoo! Search BOSS

References

External links
 Google Custom Search

Custom Search
2006 software
Computer-related introductions in 2006